Peruvamkulangara is a small administrative ward near Ollur, Thrissur district, Kerala, India. The term comes from Peruvan (very big) kulam (pond) kara (shore).

Cities and towns in Thrissur district